The 2013 German Masters were held from January 25 to 27 at the Curling Club Hamburg in Hamburg, Germany as part of the 2012–13 World Curling Tour. The event was held in a round-robin format. In the final, David Murdoch of Scotland, skipping for Tom Brewster, defeated Rasmus Stjerne of Denmark with a score of 6–1.

Teams
The teams are listed as follows:

Round-robin standings
Final round-robin standings

Playoffs

References

External links

German Masters
Masters (curling)
Curling competitions in Germany